LORAN-C transmitter Fallon was the Master station of the U.S. West Coast LORAN-C Chain ( GRI 9940). It used a transmission power of 400 kW.

The Fallon LORAN-C transmitter was situated near Fallon, Nevada at  near Nevada State Route 723 and the Soda Lakes volcano. 

The station was closed on February 8, 2010 as a budget cut.  The station, and all of the others, were considered to be obsolete with the general availability of GPS systems.

External links
 http://www.tech-service.net/loran/LORAN-1.XLS
 http://www.megapulse.com/chaininfo.html

Formerly Used Defense Sites in Nevada
Fallon
Closed facilities of the United States Coast Guard
Towers in Nevada
United States Coast Guard Aviation
2010 disestablishments in Nevada